Chaudhry Amir Hussain (born 22 June 1942; Jammu and Kashmir) is a Pakistani politician. He was the 17th Speaker of National Assembly of Pakistan, serving from 2002 to 2008.

Chaudhry Amir Hussain was born in Jammu. His family migrated to Sialkot in 1947. He did M.A., LLB from the University of the Punjab & enrolled as an advocate. He is now advocate of Supreme Court of Pakistan. He started his parliamentary politics in 1985 when he was elected Member National Assembly of Pakistan. He represented his constituency for five terms. He remained Federal Minister for Law, Justice and Parliamentary affairs. He also served as a Speaker National Assembly of Pakistan from 2002 to 2008.

On October 2, 2007, 85 Pakistani opposition lawmakers resigned from the country's parliament to derail President Pervez Musharraf's re-election bid. The Parliament was to elect the new president before October 15. National Assembly Speaker Chaudhry Amir Hussain stated that the resignations would not affect the presidential election.

Hussain was defeated in the February 2008 parliamentary election.

References

Living people
Pakistan Muslim League (Q) politicians
People from Sialkot
Speakers of the National Assembly of Pakistan
1942 births
Pakistan Muslim League (N) politicians
Pakistan Muslim League (F) politicians
Punjabi people
University of the Punjab alumni